This is a list of Norway football transfers for the 2010 transfer window. Only moves featuring at least one Tippeligaen club are listed.

Stabæk

In:

Out:

Rosenborg

In:

Out:

Lyn

In:

Out:

Lillestrøm

In:

Out:

Aalesund

In:

Out:

Tromsø

In:

Out:

Bodø/Glimt

In:

Out:

Fredrikstad

In:

Out:

Strømsgodset

In:

Out:

Molde

In:

Out:

Start

In:

Out:

Viking

In:

Out:

Odd Grenland

In:

Out:

Vålerenga

In:

Out:

Sandefjord

In:

Out:

Notes and references

Transfers
Norway
Norway
2010